John Tecumseh “Tauy” Jones (1800-1873) was a Chippewa leader and businessman who served as an interpreter for the Pottawatomie tribe in Kansas. He was also a leader and Baptist minister for the Ottawa tribe, a friend of abolitionist John Brown, and a co-founder of Ottawa University in Ottawa, Kansas.

Early life
John Tecumseh Jones was born in Canada in 1808 to father of British ancestry and a Chippewa mother. Jones spent his earliest years with a sister and her blacksmith husband on Mackinac Island in Michigan. While living there he befriended a Captain Connor and rode on his ship to Detroit to live with Connor's family where he learned English and French. Due to Connor's alcoholism, he threw Jones out of the Connor home after Mrs. Connor died, and Baptists took in Jones and recruited him and other local Indians in the 1820s to attend a Baptist mission scool, Carey Mission (now in Indiana, then part of Michigan) for four or five years where he reacquired a knowledge of Indigenous languages. Next he enrolled at what is now Colgate University in New York, but left after almost four years due to his health. Jones then taught at the Choctaw Academy in Kentucky for a year before visiting his sister and going to Sault Ste. Marie as an interpreter.

Move to Kansas
In 1838 Jones moved to Kansas to serve as a Pottawatomie interpreter and leader, and then worked with Rev. Jotham Meeker a Baptist missionary and printer. In 1840 Tauy married Rachel Littleman, from the Stockbridge–Munsee Community. After her death, he married Jane Kelly in 1845, a missionary from Maine. He acquired a trading post in 1848 from a trader named Roby on what is now Tauy Creek, and Jones built a frame and log house and hotel which was a main stop between Fort Leavenworth and Fort Scott. Scott was sympathetic to the abolitionist Free State cause and was a friend of John Brown. Pro-slavery Missourians burned his house in 1856, and then his next house on the site was burned as well. In 1862 he started the process of building a third house on the same site, a large stone home now known as the Tauy Jones House, and he hired Damon Higbie of LeLoup.

Affiliation with Ottawa tribe and Ottawa University
Starting in the 1840s Jones was adopted into the Ottawa tribe and became a leader of that tribe where he received the nickname "Tauy" or "Ottaway," which was an abbreviated version of "Ottawa." While serving as a representative of the Ottawa tribe in 1860, Jones suggested founding an integrated white and Indian school in 1860 which eventually became Ottawa University, and he was actively involved with the school until his death. He died in 1873 and was buried in the Indian cemetery northeast of Ottawa.
 Jones also was a co-founder of Ottawa University and the school's oldest building, Tauy Jones Hall, is named after him.

References

American abolitionists
Ojibwe Jones family
Baptist missionaries in the United States
Baptist missionaries from the United States
Canadian Baptist missionaries
Ottawa University
People from Ottawa, Kansas
People from Mackinac Island, Michigan
Colgate University alumni
Alumni of Native American boarding schools
Religious figures of the indigenous peoples of North America
1800 births
1873 deaths